Christopher Jordan Dorner (June 4, 1979 – February 12, 2013) was a former officer of the Los Angeles Police Department who, beginning on February 3, 2013, committed a series of shootings in Orange County, Los Angeles County, Riverside County and San Bernardino County, California. The victims were law enforcement officers and the daughter of a retired police captain. Dorner killed four people and wounded three others. On February 12, 2013, Dorner died during a standoff with San Bernardino County Sheriff's Deputies after a shootout at a cabin in the San Bernardino Mountains.

A manifesto posted by Dorner on Facebook declared "unconventional and asymmetric warfare" upon the Los Angeles Police Department (LAPD), their families and their associates, unless the LAPD admitted publicly he was fired in retaliation for reporting excessive force.

In two separate incidents during the manhunt, police shot at three civilians unrelated to Dorner, mistaking their pickup trucks for the vehicle being driven by Dorner (which was a dark gray 2005 Nissan Titan). One of the civilians was hit by the police gunfire, another was wounded by shattered glass, and a third individual was injured when police rammed his vehicle and opened fire. The officers involved were not charged with any crime.

Background

Early life 
Christopher Jordan Dorner was born on June 4, 1979, in New York and grew up in Southern California. He attended Cypress High School in Cypress, California, where he graduated in 1997. Dorner graduated from Southern Utah University in 2001, with a major in political science and a minor in psychology. While there, he was a football running back from 1999 to 2000.

Dorner later stated that he was the only African-American student in his school from first grade to seventh grade, and that he had altercations due to racism. When he was a teenager, he decided to become a police officer and joined a youth program offered by the police department in La Palma, where he lived at the time of the shootings. Neighbors described Dorner as belonging to an admired, well-liked family and a man who usually kept to himself. He was previously married, with no children. Court records show his wife filed for divorce in 2007.

Navy Reservist 
Dorner was a United States Navy Reserve officer, commissioned in 2002. He commanded a security unit at the Naval Air Station Fallon (Fallon, Nevada), served with a Mobile Inshore Undersea Warfare Unit from June 2004 to February 2006, and was deployed to Bahrain with Coastal Riverine Group Two from November 2006 to April 2007. He was honorably discharged from the Navy Reserve as a lieutenant on February 1, 2013.

In 2002, while a student at Undergraduate Pilot Training at Vance Air Force Base (Enid, Oklahoma), Dorner and a classmate found a bag containing nearly  that belonged to the nearby Enid Korean Church of Grace. The two handed the money to the police. When asked their motive, Dorner replied that, "The military stresses integrity. ... There was a couple of thousand dollars, and if people are willing to give that to a church, it must be pretty important to them." Dorner also stated his mother taught him honesty and integrity. During his time as a reservist, Dorner received a Navy Rifle Marksmanship Ribbon and a Navy Pistol Shot Ribbon with expert device.

Los Angeles Police Department 
During his time as a naval reservist, Dorner joined the LAPD. He entered the police academy in 2005, graduating in 2006. Shortly afterwards, his duties as a probationary officer were interrupted when he was deployed by the Navy Reserve to Bahrain. On his return from duty in July 2007, Dorner was paired with training officer Teresa Evans to complete his probationary training. According to the Los Angeles Times, Evans said that on Dorner's first day working with her, he told her that he planned to sue the LAPD after he completed his probationary period, in response to how the LAPD had responded to complaints he had previously made against his classmates.

Allegations against training officer 
On July 28, 2007, Dorner and Evans responded to the Doubletree Hotel in San Pedro, California regarding a disturbance being caused by Christopher Gettler, who had schizophrenia with severe dementia. Dorner filed a report alleging that Evans had used excessive force in her treatment of Gettler, accusing her of twice kicking Gettler in the chest and once in the face while he was handcuffed and lying on the ground. Gettler's father testified that his son told him he had been kicked by a police officer. Dorner filed the report the day after being told that Evans' evaluation said Dorner needed to improve his performance.

The LAPD investigated the complaint, examining the allegation against Evans and the truthfulness of Dorner's report, through an internal review board of three members—two LAPD captains and a criminal defense attorney. During the seven-month investigation of Dorner's complaint, Evans was assigned to desk duty and was not allowed to earn money outside of her LAPD job. Dorner's attorney at the board hearing was former LAPD captain Randal Quan.

The review board heard testimony from a number of witnesses. Two hotel employees testified that they did not see Evans kick Gettler. Additionally a port police officer testified that he did not see Evans kick Gettler, however some aspects of his statement contradicted photographs from the scene.  Gettler was brought to the police station and given medical treatment for injuries to his face, but did not mention being kicked at that time. According to Gettler's father, later that day, Gettler told his father that he had been kicked by an officer, and his father testified to that at Dorner's disciplinary hearing. In a videotaped interview with Dorner's attorney, shown at the hearing, Gettler stated that he was kicked in the face by a female police officer on the day and in the place in question; however, when Gettler testified at the hearing, his responses to questioning were described as "generally ... incoherent and nonresponsive." The investigation concluded that there was no kicking and, later, decided that Dorner had lied.

Termination and failed appeal 
In 2008, Dorner was fired by the LAPD for making false statements in his report and in his testimony against Evans. Dorner's attorney, Quan, stated that Dorner was treated unfairly and was being made a scapegoat. Dorner appealed his termination by filing a writ of mandamus with the Los Angeles County Superior Court. Judge David Yaffe wrote that he was "uncertain whether the training officer kicked the suspect or not" but nevertheless upheld the department's decision to fire Dorner, according to the Los Angeles Times. Yaffe ruled that he would presume that the LAPD's accusations that Dorner's report was false would stand even though he did not know if his report of Evans kicking Gettler was false. This enraged Dorner, who yelled out in disbelief at the end of the hearing, "I told the truth! How can this [ruling] happen?".

Dorner appealed to the California Court of Appeal, which affirmed the lower court's ruling on October 3, 2011. Under California law, administrative findings (in this case by the LAPD) are entitled to a presumption of correctness and the petitioner (in this case Dorner) bears the burden of proving that they were incorrect. The appeals court concluded that the LAPD had substantial evidence for its finding that Dorner was not credible in his allegations against Evans.

Manifesto for killings 
In early February 2013, coincident with the start of a series of revenge shootings, Dorner was purported to have posted a detailed note on his Facebook page, discussing his history, motivations, and plans. This 11,000-word post became known as his "manifesto".

Dorner listed 40 law enforcement personnel whom he was prepared to kill and stated: "I know most of you who personally know me are in disbelief to hear from media reports that I am suspected of committing such horrendous murders and have taken drastic and shocking actions in the last couple of days", the posting began. "Unfortunately, this is a necessary evil that I do not enjoy but must partake and complete for substantial change to occur within the LAPD and reclaim my name. The department has not changed since the Rampart and Rodney King days. It has gotten worse...." Dorner issued a single demand: a public admission by the LAPD that his termination was in retaliation for reporting excessive force. He also asked journalists to pursue "the truth", pointing out specific lines of investigation for reporters to follow under the Freedom of Information Act.

On February 9, 2013, in response to Dorner's manifesto and the start of the killing spree, LAPD Chief Charlie Beck informed Dorner through the media that there would be a review of the disciplinary case that led to Dorner's dismissal. Beck said officials would re-examine the allegations by Dorner that his law enforcement career was undone by racist colleagues.

Timeline of killings and manhunt 
Dorner's killing spree began with a package stating his complaints, sent to Anderson Cooper and arriving at CNN on February 1, 2013. After the first killings, Dorner's threats in his manifesto caused law enforcement to mount a widespread manhunt that spread from California to Nevada and Mexico. Protection details were set up for over 40 potential targets of Dorner, and thousands of police were assigned to patrol Southern California's highways. The LAPD also took patrol officers off motorcycles for their protection.

February 1, 2013 
Anderson Cooper received a package at his office containing a DVD that stated Dorner's case against the LAPD.

February 3 
During the evening hours in Irvine, California, 28-year-old Monica Quan and her fiancé, 27-year-old Keith Lawrence, were shot dead in Lawrence's parked white Kia Optima outside their condominium complex. Quan, a women's basketball assistant coach at Cal State Fullerton, was the daughter of Randal Quan, a former LAPD captain and the lawyer who represented Dorner during his 2008 dismissal hearing. Lawrence was a campus public safety officer for the University of Southern California.

February 4 
Dorner's "manifesto" was posted online, stating his motive for the shootings was to clear his name. He wrote, "I will not be alive to see my name cleared. That's what this is about, my name."

February 5 
According to military sources, Dorner checked into Naval Base Point Loma in San Diego, but skipped checkout procedures when leaving.

February 6 
Dorner's manifesto specifically named Randal Quan and his family as targets, leading Irvine police to name Dorner as the prime suspect in the murders of Monica Quan and Keith Lawrence. The manifesto claimed Quan had failed to represent Dorner's interests in favor of those of the LAPD. Dorner reported specific acts of specific officers participating in the retaliation, but their names were redacted by media sources at the request of law enforcement who cited officer safety concerns.

February 7 
McDaniel reported seeing a man matching Dorner's description at a gas station in Corona. The officers investigated the report, and they were following a pickup truck when the driver stopped, got out, and fired a rifle at them, grazing the head of one officer.

About twenty minutes after the Corona shooting two officers of the neighboring Riverside Police Department were ambushed and shot while stopped in their marked patrol unit at a red traffic light. One officer, Michael Crain, died shortly after the shooting; the other was rushed to a nearby hospital in critical condition for surgery and survived.

About an hour and 25 minutes after the Riverside shooting, at approximately 3:00 am, a man matching Dorner's description tried to steal a boat in San Diego, telling the boat's captain that he would take the boat to Mexico. A federal criminal complaint was filed against Dorner this same day for allegedly fleeing California to avoid prosecution.

Investigators spread out to search for Dorner in the surrounding area, and about 125 officers went from door to door. All schools in the Bear Valley Unified School District were placed into a state of lockdown.

February 9 
CNN reported that the Los Angeles Police Dept. was re-opening its investigation into Dorner's dismissal from the LAPD so as to reassure the public that the police were doing everything in their power to capture Dorner.

February 10 
Authorities offered a $1 million reward for information leading to the capture of Dorner. For the first time, Dorner's actions were described as a form of "domestic terrorism". With Dorner believed to be hiding somewhere in the San Bernardino Mountains, an unmanned aerial vehicle was deployed to aid the search from the air amid fears that Dorner would head for the Mexican border.

Later in the day, a Lowe's home improvement store in Northridge, Los Angeles was evacuated based on reports of a possible sighting of Dorner.

February 11 
The Riverside District Attorney filed formal charges against Dorner for the murder of a police officer and the attempted murder of three other officers.

February 12 
Police raided a hotel in Tijuana, Mexico, based on a tip that Dorner was there. Authorities also discovered surveillance footage of Dorner purchasing scuba diving gear at a sporting goods store in Torrance, California.

A message posted to the Twitter account of the San Bernardino County district attorney's office said:

The message was removed within a few hours.

Final mountain cabin standoff 

On February 12, San Bernardino County Sheriff's Department deputies responded to a report of a carjacking of a white Dodge truck at 12:22 pm (PST) and began looking for the vehicle on the ground and from the air. The truck's driver had not been harmed. Fish and Game officers were the first to spot the vehicle and recognized Dorner as the driver. Officers from numerous agencies chased Dorner to a cabin near Big Bear Lake, California.

Dorner opened fire on two officers from the San Bernardino County Sheriff's Department, hitting both. The officers were airlifted to Loma Linda University Medical Center, where Detective Jeremiah MacKay was pronounced dead.

The San Bernardino Sheriff's Department confirmed to the media that Dorner was barricaded in a cabin near the command center set up for the manhunt, in a mountainous rural area northeast of Angelus Oaks, California, and that the building was surrounded by law enforcement. The Los Angeles Times reported that there might be hostages in the cabin with Dorner. A three-mile (5 km) perimeter was set up around the cabin and residents were told to remain inside with their doors locked.

Police initially attempted to force Dorner out of the cabin by using tear gas and demanding over loudspeakers that he surrender. When Dorner did not respond, police used a demolition vehicle to knock down most walls of the building. They then shot pyrotechnic tear gas canisters into the cabin, which resulted in the cabin catching fire. Such devices are nicknamed "burners", as the heat generated by the pyrotechnic reaction often causes fires. Shortly thereafter, a single gunshot was heard from the cabin. As the fire continued, ammunition was exploding from within the cabin, making it dangerous for officials to try to put out the fire. Law enforcement experts differ on whether it was justified to use pyrotechnic devices to end the standoff, instead of waiting for Dorner to come out.

In the evening of February 12, LAPD and the San Bernardino County Sheriff's Office denied reports that a body believed to be that of Dorner had been recovered from the burned cabin. In a press conference, LAPD Commander Andrew Smith stated that no body had been removed from the site, adding that reports of a body being identified were untrue as the cabin area was "too hot to make entry".

Aftermath 
On February 13, it was reported that human remains had been found in the search for Dorner's body in the cabin. A wallet with a California driver's license with the name "Christopher Dorner" was also found in the rubble of the cabin. That same day, San Bernardino County Sheriff John McMahon disputed rumors that deputies had intentionally burned down the cabin. It was also revealed that deputies had knocked on the door of the cabin earlier during the search for Dorner, but moved on when they received no answer.

On February 14, medical examiners confirmed during an autopsy, using dental records, that the charred body found in the burned-out cabin was in fact that of Dorner.

On February 15, the sheriff's office announced the autopsy showed Dorner died from a single gunshot wound to the head, with evidence indicating that it was self-inflicted. At the same news conference, Sheriff John McMahon reiterated the claim that deputies had not deliberately set the cabin on fire. The Sheriff Department's Captain Gregg Herbert, who led the assault on the cabin, claimed that the canisters were a last resort, saying, "This was our only option," and adding that the potential for fire was considered.

Police shooting of unrelated civilians 
In two separate incidents in the early morning hours of February 7, 2013, police fired on people who turned out to be unrelated to Dorner. Dorner was not present at either of the incidents.

At about 5:30 am (PST), at least seven LAPD officers on a protection detail of an unnamed LAPD official's residence in the 19500 block of Redbeam Street in the Los Angeles County city of Torrance opened fire on the back of a light blue Toyota Tacoma and shot its two occupants, Emma Hernandez, 71, and her daughter, Margie Carranza, 47, delivering newspapers for the Los Angeles Times. The vehicle, according to officers, was spotted exiting a freeway and heading to the area of the residence that officers were protecting, was thought by police to match the description of Dorner's 2005 gray Nissan Titan and was moving without its headlights on. Hernandez was shot in the back and Carranza received wounds to her hand. Their attorney claimed police "had no idea who was in that vehicle" when they opened fire, and that nothing about his clients or their vehicle matched the descriptions given of the suspect or his truck. The two women stated that they were given no warning prior to being fired upon.

A neighbor said the truck was used every day to deliver newspapers, and the women who used it kept their headlights off so as to not wake people up. The two women were injured, but both survived. The LAPD started an internal investigation into the shooting committed by multiple officers. According to their attorney Glen Jonas, 102 bullets holes were found in the truck. The LAPD declined to confirm the total number of officers involved or how many bullets were fired or if any verbal warnings were given to the women before the shooting began.

Approximately 25 minutes after that incident, officers from the Torrance Police Department struck and opened fire on another vehicle. Like the first shooting, the incident involved a vehicle that police claimed resembled the description of Dorner's truck, but was later discovered to be a black Honda Ridgeline driven by a white male.

The victim of the second shooting by police was David Perdue, who was on his way to the beach to surf. A Torrance Police Department police cruiser slammed into Perdue's pickup and Torrance police officers opened fire. Perdue was not hit by any of the bullets, but reportedly suffered injuries as a result of the car impact. Police claim that Perdue's pickup truck "matched the description" of the one belonging to Dorner. However, the Los Angeles Times reported that the vehicle involved was once again a different make and color to that of the suspect's, and that Perdue "looks nothing like" the suspect.

Settlement paid 
In April 2013 the Los Angeles Police Department paid a $4.2 million settlement to Margie Carranza and Emma Hernandez, the two women who were mistakenly shot by police on the morning of February 7, 2013.

The city of Torrance initially offered a $500,000 settlement to David Perdue for ramming his pickup truck and then shooting at him on the morning of February 7, 2013. This was rejected and with the case set to go to trial in August 2014 they reached an agreement in July 2014 for a $1.8 million settlement paid by the city of Torrance to Perdue.

Use-of-force policy violation 
On February 4, 2014, LAPD chief Charlie Beck announced that eight officers had violated the LAPD's use-of-force policy and would be disciplined. Beck noted that California state law prevents him from disclosing the nature of the discipline publicly, but that discipline could range "from extensive retraining up to termination."
Disciplinary actions for the officers involved did not include criminal charges.

Reward 
On February 10, 2013, Mayor Antonio Villaraigosa announced a $1 million reward for information leading to the capture of Dorner and, because the terms of the offer were not carefully stipulated, judges had to later decide how the reward would be divided. Ultimately the reward was divided four ways, with $800,000 going to James and Karen Reynolds, who were tied up by Dorner in their Big Bear cabin before he stole their vehicle, $150,000 to Daniel McGowan, and $50,000 to R.L. McDaniel.

Protests against the Los Angeles Police Department
There were online protests against the LAPD as well as a protest at police headquarters on February 16, 2013. Protesters stated that they objected to the manner in which Dorner's dismissal was handled, the reckless shooting of civilians by the LAPD during the manhunt, and the tactics used which resulted in the fire in the cabin in which Dorner was hiding.

See also 
 2016 shooting of Dallas police officers
 List of homicides in California
 Primorsky Partisans

Explanatory notes

References

External links 
 "Manhunt for ex-LAPD officer". Los Angeles Times
 CHRISTOPHER DORNER, Plaintiff and Appellant, v. LOS ANGELES POLICE DEPARTMENT et al., Defendants and Respondents. No. B225674. Court of Appeals of California, Second District, Division Four. Filed October 3, 2011.
 

2013 in California
2013 murders in the United States
Anti-police violence in the United States
Attacks in the United States in 2013
Crimes in California
Deaths by firearm in California
February 2013 events in the United States
History of Irvine, California
Law enforcement in California
Los Angeles Police Department
Manhunts
Murder in California
Spree shootings in the United States
Terrorist incidents in California
Terrorist incidents in the United States in 2013